Niroye Zamini Football Club (Niruye Zemini) is an Iranian football club based in Tehran, Iran. It is the football team of Iran's ground forces.

History
The club was founded after the Iranian Revolution of 1979 and became the team of the Army.

They have competed in the Azadegan League for a long time. Many younger players who must serve the mandatory two-year military service end up playing for the team because the team belongs to the Iranian army.

In July 2009, Niroye Zamini terminated their sports activities due to financial problems. Gostaresh Foolad owned by Jamshid Khatibi took over their license. The club re-established later that summer and was placed in the 2nd Division The re-established club currently competes in the Azadegan League.

In 2015 the club was relegated to the 2nd Division after finishing 10th in the Azadegan League.

Season-by-season

1980s
17th of Shahrivar league 8th

The table below chronicles the achievements of Niroye Zamini in various competitions since 1999.

Sold its place in Azadegan League to another team

Football clubs in Tehran
Association football clubs established in 1980
1980 establishments in Iran
Islamic Republic of Iran Army